North Weston may refer to:

North Weston, Oxfordshire, a hamlet in Great Haseley, Oxfordshire, England
North Weston, Somerset, a village and former civil parish in Somerset, England